Elena Fuentes-Afflick is an American pediatrician who is Chief of Pediatrics at the Zuckerberg San Francisco General Hospital and Vice Dean for Academic Affairs in the School of Medicine at University of California, San Francisco. She is the former President of the Society for Pediatric Research and the American Pediatric Society. In 2010 she was elected a to the National Academy of Medicine.

Early life and education 
Fuentes-Afflick was an undergraduate student in biomedical sciences at the University of Michigan. After graduating in 1984, she moved to Michigan Medicine, where she earned her medical doctorate in 1986. She moved to the West Coast of the United States, where she worked as a pediatric intern at the UCSF Medical Center. Whilst in California, Fuentes-Afflick completed a Master of Public Health at UC Berkeley School of Public Health.

Research and career 
Fuentes-Afflick was appointed to the faculty of the University of California, San Francisco. She was awarded a Citation for Outstanding Service from the American Academy of Pediatrics in 1994.

Fuentes-Afflick is a pediatrician and epidemiologist, with a particular focus on immigrant health and health disparities. She has concentrated on equality within the research community, specifically focussing on compensation inequities in academic medicine.

Fuentes-Afflick worked with the National Academies of Sciences, Engineering, and Medicine to investigate the impact of the COVID-19 pandemic on the careers of women in science. Together with Eve Higginbotham, Leslie Gonzales, Beronda Montgomery and Renetta Garrison Tull, Fuentes-Afflick argued that the pandemic endangered the retention of women in the academy.

Awards and honors 
 2009 Elected President of the Society for Pediatric Research
 2010 Elected to the National Academy of Medicine
 2013 Society for Pediatric Research Thomas A. Hazinski Distinguished Service Award
 2020 Elected to the American Academy of Arts and Sciences
 2020 Elected to the Council of the National Academy of Medicine

Selected publications

References 

Members of the National Academy of Medicine
University of Michigan alumni
University of California, San Francisco faculty
Fellows of the American Academy of Arts and Sciences
American pediatricians
Living people
Year of birth missing (living people)
University of Michigan Medical School alumni
UC Berkeley School of Public Health alumni
21st-century American women physicians
21st-century American physicians